Fast and Furious is a 1939 American mystery comedy film directed by Busby Berkeley. The film stars Franchot Tone and Ann Sothern as Joel and Garda Sloane, a crime-solving married couple who are also rare book dealers. It is the last of a Metro-Goldwyn-Mayer trilogy, along with Fast Company (1938) and Fast and Loose (1939). However, different actors played the couple each time.

Plot
Joel and Garda Sloane, a husband and wife sleuthing duo, sell rare books in New York and dream of taking a vacation to escape the sweltering heat of the city. Joel decides to take Garda to Seaside City, where his friend Mike Stevens is managing a beauty pageant. In addition to his vacation plans, Joel, who has invested $5,000 in the pageant, plans to supervise the event's finances. Soon after arriving in Seaside City, Joel discovers that Eric Bartell, the unscrupulous promoter of the pageant, is duping Stevens. Garda is troubled to learn that Joel is a pageant judge and becomes jealous when he socializes with the contestants prior to the pageant.

Joel senses trouble when New York racketeer Ed Connors arrives to monitor Bartell's activities and when Lily Cole, Bartell's publicity director, lashes out at contestant Jerry Lawrence for vying with her for Bartell's attentions. A detective tells Joel that Bartell will be arrested on swindling charges as soon as a warrant is issued. When Bartell is mysteriously murdered, Stevens is arrested and suspected of the crime because he had visited Bartell to demand all of the money owed to him and was last person seen with Bartell. Although Joel and Garda are warned by Chief Miller not to involve themselves in the case, along with the help of newspaper columnist Ted Bentley they begin to investigate the murder. Soon after, an attempt is made on their lives when a falling elevator nearly crushes them. Joel does not believe that Stevens was the murderer, but instead suspects Lily, because she and Bartell were involved in a dispute prior to the murder. Later, when Joel discovers that Jerry smokes the same brand of cigarettes as the one found smoldering at the scene of Bartell's murder, he interrogates her and she names Connors as the murderer. Connors, overhearing her accusation, attacks her and tells Joel that she is trying to frame him.

When Jerry is found murdered, Joel deduces that the murderer must be Bentley, because he is the only person who knew that he had proof against Jerry. Joel tricks Bentley into confessing his guilt, but Bentley, in an attempt to silence Joel, tries to kill him. However, he is prevented from doing so by the police, who arrest him. Eventually, Joel learns that Bentley killed Bartell because Jerry threw him over for Bartell, and that he killed Jerry because she knew too much.

Cast
 Franchot Tone as Joel Sloane
 Ann Sothern as Garda Sloane
 Ruth Hussey as Lily Cole
 Lee Bowman as Mike Stevens
 Allyn Joslyn as Ted Bentley
 John Miljan as Eric Bartell
 Bernard Nedell as Ed Connors
 Mary Beth Hughes as Jerry Lawrence
 Cliff Clark as Sam Travers
 James Burke as Clancy
 Frank Orth as Captain Joe Burke
 Margaret Roach as Emmy Lou
 Gladys Blake as Miss Brooklyn
 Granville Bates as Chief Miller
 Inna Gest as Miss San Antonio

Reception
In a contemporary review for The New York Times, critic Bosley Crowther compared the teaming of Franchot Tone and Ann Sothern unfavorably with the leads from the previous two films in the series and wrote: "Metro seems to be stretching an original idea to infinity–a suspicion which is practically confirmed by the plot of 'Fast and Furious.' It is a perfect specimen of unoriginal attenuation ... which results in a couple of murders, a couple of limp comedy situations and an interminable lot of chasing about leading nowhere. Mr. Tone and Miss Sothern banter through it in the manner of third-string substitutes who know that the game is hopelessly lost."

See also 
 List of film series with three entries

References

External links

 
 
 
 

1939 films
American comedy mystery films
American black-and-white films
Films directed by Busby Berkeley
Films scored by Daniele Amfitheatrof
Metro-Goldwyn-Mayer films
1930s comedy mystery films
Films with screenplays by Harry Kurnitz
1939 comedy films
1930s English-language films
1930s American films